The Court of Session Act 1808 (also known as the Administration of Justice (Scotland) Act 1808) was an Act of the Parliament of the United Kingdom (citation 48 Geo III c. 151) which reformed Scotland's highest court, the Court of Session. Reform of the Court of Session had been proposed as early as 1805 by the Whig government trying to impose a system based on that of England, especially the use of a civil jury trial. That particular government fell before their reform bill was enacted. In 1808, reform was pushed through by a Tory government. The Court was split into two divisions. Judgments of the new divisions could only be appealed to the House of Lords at the leave of the division, or in the case of a dispute between its judges. Decrees of the Lords Ordinary could only be appealed to the House of Lords after being reviews by the Divisional judges. The Act also established a commission to review the processes of the Court of Session, including the possibility of the introduction of jury trial and the creation of permanent Lords Ordinary. The Commissioner's review led to two further Acts, the Court of Session Act 1810 and the Court of Session Act 1813. These two Acts created the existing system of two divisions known as the Outer House and the Inner House. Trial by jury came later with the Jury Trials (Scotland) Act 1815.

It was repealed by the Court of Session Act 1988

References

1808 in British law
Acts of the Parliament of the United Kingdom concerning Scotland
Court of Session
United Kingdom Acts of Parliament 1808
1808 in Scotland
Repealed United Kingdom Acts of Parliament